Low-threshold treatment programs are harm reduction-based health care centers targeted towards people who use substances. "Low-threshold" programs are programs that make minimal demands on the patient, offering services without attempting to control their intake of drugs, and providing counselling only if requested. Low-threshold programs may be contrasted with "high-threshold" programs, which require the user to accept a certain level of control and which demand that the patient accept counselling and cease all drug use as a precondition of support.

Low-threshold treatment programs are distinct from simple needle exchange programs, and may include comprehensive healthcare and counseling services. The International Journal of Drug Policy in its volume 24 published an Editorial which endeavoured to define a service known to be "low-threshold", based on some popular and known criteria. According to that Editorial, low-threshold services for drug users can be defined as those which offer services to drug users; do not impose abstinence from drug use as a condition of service access; and endeavour to reduce other documented barriers to service access.  Beyond comprehensive needle exchange services, other examples of  low-threshold, community-based programs include those that support people who use alcohol or drugs to consider positive or health protective changes without a demand for "recovery," such as those piloted in New York City in the 1990s as "recovery readiness" efforts to bolster HIV prevention.

Background
Injection drug users (IDUs) are at risk of a wide range of health problems arising from non-sterile injecting practices, complications of the drug itself or of the lifestyle associated with drug use and dependence.  Furthermore, unrelated health problems, such as diabetes, may be neglected because of drug dependence. Sharing of health information with police, or requirements that patients abstain from all illegal drug use prior to receiving support are further impediments to health seeking, or require patients to lie about drug use in order to receive other lifesaving services.  For all these reasons, despite their increased health care needs, IDUs do not have the required access to care or may be reluctant to use conventional services.  Consequently, their health may deteriorate to a point at which emergency treatment is required, with considerable costs to both the IDUs and the health system. Accordingly, harm reduction based health care centers, also known as targeted health care outlet or low-threshold health care outlet for IDUs have been established across a range of settings utilising a variety of models.  These targeted outlets provide integrated, low-threshold services within a harm-reduction framework targeting IDUs, and sometimes include social and/or other services. Where a particular service is not provided, referral and assistance with access is available. In 2007, for example, 33% of all US needle-syringe programs (NSPs) provided on-site medical care, and 7% provided buprenorphine treatment.  Similarly, in many European countries NSP outlets serve as low-threshold primary health care centers targeting primarily IDUs.

Health care models
These targeted outlets vary widely and may be either "distributive", providing basic harm reduction services and simple healthcare with facilitated referrals to specialist services, or "one-stop-shops" where a range of services including specialist services are provided onsite. The services being offered by these outlets range from simple needle and syringe provision, to expanded services including basic and preventive primary healthcare, hepatitis B and A vaccinations, hepatitis C testing, counselling, tuberculosis screening and sometimes opioid maintenance therapy. Some centers offer hepatitis, HIV treatment and dental care.  The goal of these outlets is to provide: (1) opportunistic health care, (2) increased temporal and spatial availability of health care, (3) trustworthy services of health care, (4) cost-effective mode of health care, (5) targeted and tailored services.

In the United States as of 2011, 211 NSPs were known to be operating in 32 states, the District of Columbia, Puerto Rico and the Indian Nations.  The bulk of funding has come from state and local governments, since for most of the last several decades, federal funding for needle exchange programs has been specifically banned.

Globally, as of 2008, at least 77 countries and territories offer NSPs with varying structures, aims, and goals. Some countries use needle exchange services as part of integrated programs to contain drug use, while others aim simply to contain HIV infection as their top priority, considering a reduction in the incidence of drug use as a much lower priority.  Acceptance of NSPs vary widely from country to country. On the one hand, in Australia and New Zealand, electronic dispensing machines are available at selected locations such as the Auckland needle exchange and the Christchurch needle exchange, allowing needle exchange service 24 hours to registered users.  On the other hand, over half of the countries in Asia, the Middle East, and North Africa retain the death penalty for drug offenses, although some have not carried out executions in recent years.

Evaluation
Low-threshold programs offering needle exchange have faced much opposition on political and moral grounds.  Concerns are often expressed that NSPs may encourage drug use, or may actually increase the number of dirty needles in the community.  Another fear is that NSPs may draw drug activity into the communities in which they operate.  It has also been argued that in fighting disease, needle exchanges take attention away from bigger drug problems, and that, contrary to saving lives, they actually contribute to drug-related deaths.  Even in Australia, which is considered a leading country in harm reduction, a survey showed that a third of the public believed that NSPs encouraged drug use, and 20% believed that NSPs dispensed drugs.  In the United States, the ambivalent public attitude towards NSPs is often reflected in police interference, with 43% of NSP program managers reporting frequent (at least monthly) client harassment, 31% reporting frequent confiscation of clients' syringes, 12% reporting frequent client arrest, and 26% reporting uninvited police appearances at program sites.  A single 1997 study which showed a correlation between frequent program use and elevated rates of HIV infection among IDUs in Vancouver, Canada, has become widely cited by opponents of NSPs as demonstrating their counter-productiveness.

Authors from the 1997 Vancouver study have, in multiple publications, issued disclaimers against the misuse of their work by opponents of NSPs.  They point out that frequent attendees of the program tended to be young and often indulged in extreme high-risk behaviors.  The 1997 results were hence of statistically biased sampling. They have emphasized that the correct message to be derived from their 1997 study can be read in the title of their work: "Needle exchange is not enough".  This is the same message presented by many other articles since.

Comprehensive, systematic surveys of the costs and effectiveness of low-threshold primary healthcare programs are not available due to the heterogeneity of these programs and the study designs.  Narrower focus studies dealing solely with the needle exchange issue are abundant, however, and generally support the thesis that NSPs reduce the risk of prevalence of HIV, hepatitis and other blood-borne diseases. These studies suggest that such outlets improve the overall health status of IDUs and save on the health budget by reducing episodes in emergency departments and tertiary hospitals.  In Australia, monitoring of drug users participating in NSPs showed the incidence of HIV among NSP clients to be essentially identical to that of the general population.  Fears that NSPs may draw drug activity into the communities in which they operate are contradicted by a study that showed that by far the greatest number of clients of an NSP in Chicago came to the area to exchange needles (60%) rather than to  buy drugs (3.8%).

Internationally, support for the effectiveness of low-threshold programs including needle exchange have come from studies conducted in Afghanistan, China, Spain, Taiwan, Estonia, Canada, Iran, and many other countries. However, in many countries, there is strong opposition to such programs.

Despite the lack of randomized clinical trials demonstrating the impact of  low-threshold services, the available evidence, barriers to service access and the late presentation of seriously ill IDUs to hospital, suggests the ongoing need for targeted and low-threshold services.  In addition, prevention of HIV and hepatitis C transmission is clearly possible for those unable or unwilling to stop injecting drug use, and a range of countries using low-threshold approach have achieved control or virtual elimination of HIV transmission among people who inject drugs.  For these reasons, organizations ranging from the U.S. National Institutes of Health, the Centers for Disease Control, the American Bar Association, the American Medical Association, the American Psychological Association, the World Health Organization,  the European Monitoring Center for Drugs and Drug Addiction and many others have endorsed low-threshold programs including needle exchange.

References

Harm reduction
Drug policy
Substance-related disorders
Drug rehabilitation
Addiction medicine